Vittoria Ceretti (born 7 June 1998) is an Italian model.

Early life 
Ceretti was born in Brescia, Italy in 1998, daughter of Giuseppe Ceretti, owner of a flooring company, and Francesca (née Lazzari), a housewife. When she was 14 years old, she entered the Elite Model Look competition in Italy, where she was chosen as a finalist.

Career 

Ceretti made her runway debut in the Italian city of Milan, for the designer Kristina Ti. Since then, she has modeled for Max Mara, Chloé, Paco Rabanne, Alexander McQueen, DKNY, Lanvin, Ralph Lauren, Alexander Wang, Jason Wu, Celine, Loewe, Jacquemus, Salvatore Ferragamo, Anna Sui, Hugo Boss, Dolce & Gabbana, Armani, Prada, Proenza Schouler, JW Anderson, Moschino, Fendi, Valentino, Roberto Cavalli, Versace, Missoni, Louis Vuitton, Burberry, Chanel, Christian Dior, Miu Miu, Givenchy, Alberta Ferretti, Marc Jacobs, Michael Kors, Bottega Veneta, Tom Ford, Tommy Hilfiger, Versace, and Yves Saint Laurent.

Ceretti has appeared on the cover of Vogue, Vogue Italia, Vogue Paris, Vogue Japan, Vogue Germany, Vogue Spain, British Vogue, Vogue Korea, Vogue China, Harper's Bazaar, Elle, Glamour, Grazia, IO Donna and more. Ceretti was one of seven models on the cover of Vogue'''s March 2017 issue, which celebrated the magazine's 125th anniversary.

According to Vogue Italia, Vittoria Ceretti was the most searched model of 2018, on their website.

Vittoria is currently ranked as an "Industry Icon" by models.com.

 Personal life 
In an interview for Vogue Paris'', Ceretti mentioned that she would have studied either acting or psychology if she hadn't begun a career as a model.

She married Matteo Milleri, an Italian DJ, on June 1, 2020, in Ibiza, Spain.

References

External links
 

Living people
Italian female models
1998 births
People from Brescia
The Society Management models